Black Jazz Records was a jazz record company and label founded in Oakland, California by pianist Gene Russell (December 2, 1932 - May 3, 1981) and percussionist Dick Schory. The label was created to promote the talents of young African American jazz musicians and singers, and released twenty albums between 1971 and 1975. The artists who recorded for Black Jazz Records included Cleveland Eaton, former bassist for Count Basie and Ramsey Lewis, and organist/pianist Doug Carn, whose four albums were the most successful of any Black Jazz artist. Carn's wife at the time, Jean Carn, sang on his albums; she changed her name to Jean Carne and had a successful solo career as an R & B singer. Singer Kellee Patterson gained notice as the first black Miss Indiana in 1971, before recording her debut album, Maiden Voyage, with Black Jazz Records in 1973. The label was distributed and financed by Ovation Records, a country and western label based in Chicago, which was also founded by Schory. Black Jazz Records was considered at the time to be the first jazz label started by an African American since brothers John and Reb Spikes started Sunshine Records in 1921.

History
Black Jazz Records was founded in 1969, and released its first four albums on August 1, 1971. The founders were Gene Russell, a jazz pianist, and Dick Schory, a Grammy-nominated percussionist also known for his development of the stereo recording techniques quadraphonic sound, Dynagroove, and RCA Victor's Stereo Action. Schory founded Ovation Records in 1969, after leaving RCA. Ovation financed and distributed Black Jazz Records, while Russell served as an A&R executive. Russell also produced and engineered the label's initial releases, while maintaining complete artistic control through his production company, GR Productions.

Russell's vision for Black Jazz Records was for it to be geared towards the Black community, and all of the artists recording for the label were African American. The label was created as an alternative to traditional jazz, invoking a more political and spiritual tone, often with funk overtones. Black Jazz released various types of music including, funk, free jazz and soul jazz. Black Jazz Records was also known for its unique album cover concept, which was copyrighted by the label. The concept included a design that allowed the title to be shown regardless of how the albums were positioned in the browsing rack at record stores. All of the albums had white lettering on a black background, with the liner notes and personnel listed in the same place on each of the label's releases. Russell organized a promotional tour for the label in September 1971. In addition to promoting the first four Black Jazz albums, Russell and his marketing consultant Ray Lawrence did radio, television and newspaper interviews to showcase the label and its artists. A 1974 Billboard magazine article reported that Doug Carn, one of the label's more successful artists, sold more records than Dave Brubeck and Ramsey Lewis at that time. The label existed for six years during its first run, folding in 1975.

Re-discovery

James Hardge
Gene Russell closed Black Jazz Records in 1975 to focus on his new label, Aquarican Records. He started the new label in an effort to "remove the stigma attached to jazz titles." Russell intended to move Black Jazz artists to Aquarican Records, but he did not sign his first artist to the label until 1980, when he signed singer Talita Long. Long recorded with Gene Russell as well as Henry Franklin, and is the mother of actress Nia Long. Gene Russell died in 1981, and the albums from Black Jazz Records faded out of circulation until 1986, when James Hardge, Jr. bought the inactive label's master recordings. By the early 1990s, he had re-issued the entire collection on compact disc, including a new release by Doug Carn.

Interest in Black Jazz was revived in the early 1990s when Carn's songs "Infant Eyes", "Adam's Apple", and "Spirit in a New Land" became popular in England and Japan. The label's music also became popular through samples used by hip-hop artists such as Ice Cube and A Tribe Called Quest. This new demand led to numerous bootleg copies of Black Jazz material entering the market. While Hardge maintains a Myspace page for the label, attempts to sell the CDs online were unsuccessful, and he eventually offered Black Jazz Records for sale on Craigslist for $285,000 in 2011. The Black Jazz catalog was eventually licensed to the Japanese label Snow Dog Records.

Snow Dog Records
Snow Dog Records acquired the licensing to Black Jazz Records in 2012, and began reissuing the albums as its first project. The remastered albums included new liner notes and previously unpublished photographs. They have also released a series featuring remixes of Black Jazz material produced by DJ's from Japan, Germany, and the United States: DJ Mitsu, Gilles Peterson, Muro, and Theo Parrish.

Legacy
The legacy of Black Jazz Records has been kept alive by reissues of its albums, remixes and samples by DJ's and hip-hop artists. There have also been occasional tours and concerts where former Black Jazz artists have performed music from their recordings with the label. Doug Carn, Rudolph Johnson and Henry Franklin joined other veteran musicians as the Black Jazz Allstars, and performed a series of shows at the Center for African and African American Art and Culture in San Francisco, California, from April 29 to May 7, 2000. Guitarist Calvin Keys joined former label mates Henry Franklin and Carl Burnett in "Heroes of Black Jazz, a Tribute to Gene Russell", on July 14, 2011 at the Barbara Morrison Performing Arts Center in Leimert Park, Los Angeles. Calvin Keys' first album, Shawn-Neeq, originally recorded with Black Jazz Records in 1971, was re-issued by Tompkins Square Records in 2012. Keys celebrated the re-issue of "Shawn-Neeq" by performing the entire album at Yoshi's jazz club in San Francisco, California on January 5, 2012. Doug Carn and his ex-wife Jean Carne played together at the 2013 Savannah Jazz Festival in Savannah, Georgia on September 28, 2013.

Black Jazz Records Discography

Black Jazz Releases Under Snow Dog Records

Re-mix Series

Musicians
Gene Russell - Piano
Calvin Keys - Guitar
Walter Bishop, Jr. - Piano
Henry Franklin - Bass
Doug Carn - Piano, Organ, Keyboards
Jean Carn - Vocalist
Cleveland Eaton - bass
Kellee Patterson - Vocalist
The Awakening - Instrumental Group
Chester Thompson - Organ
Rudolph Johnson - Saxophone

References

Notes

External links
Article covering e-mail conversation between DJ Prestige (Jamison Harvey) of Flea Market Funk and James Hardge.
Black Jazz Records on Myspace.
Discogs.com: Black Jazz Records.
Talkin' All That Jazz Part 10: A Tribute to Black Jazz Records (featuring 2 hours of music).
Snow Dog Records.
Barbara Morrison Performing Arts Center.

African-American history in Oakland, California
 01
Companies based in Oakland, California
Culture of Oakland, California
Defunct companies based in the San Francisco Bay Area
Defunct record labels of the United States
Jazz record labels
Music of the San Francisco Bay Area
Record labels based in California
West Coast jazz